This is a list of 167 species in Rhyssemus, a genus of aphodiine dung beetles in the family Scarabaeidae.

Rhyssemus species

 Rhyssemus africanus Petrovitz, 1963 c g
 Rhyssemus ahrensi Rakovic & Kral, 2001 c g
 Rhyssemus algiricus Lucas, 1846 c g
 Rhyssemus alluaudi Clouet, 1901 c g
 Rhyssemus ambovombensis Pittino, 1990 c g
 Rhyssemus amplicollis Pittino, 1984 c g
 Rhyssemus andreinii Pittino, 1984 c g
 Rhyssemus annaedicatus Pierotti, 1980 c g
 Rhyssemus archambaulti Bénard, 1929 c g
 Rhyssemus aspericollis Petrovitz, 1965 c g
 Rhyssemus asperocostatus Fairmaire, 1892 c g
 Rhyssemus atramentarius Péringuey, 1901 c g
 Rhyssemus aurivillii Clouet, 1901 c g
 Rhyssemus bacchusi Pittino, 1984 c g
 Rhyssemus balteatus Petrovitz, 1966 c g
 Rhyssemus bechuanus Petrovitz, 1956 c g
 Rhyssemus bedeli Clouet, 1901 c g
 Rhyssemus berytensis Marseul, 1878 c g
 Rhyssemus bilyi Rakovic, 2001 c g
 Rhyssemus biovatus Clouet, 1901 c g
 Rhyssemus birmensis Clouet, 1901 c g
 Rhyssemus blackburnei Clouet, 1901 c g
 Rhyssemus bordati Pittino, 1984 c g
 Rhyssemus brevis Pittino, 1990 c g
 Rhyssemus brevitarsis Pittino, 1984 c g
 Rhyssemus brownwoodi Gordon and Cartwright, 1980 i c g
 Rhyssemus bucciarellii Pittino, 1990 c g
 Rhyssemus buettikeri Pittino, 1984 c g
 Rhyssemus bufonis Boucomont, 1935 c g
 Rhyssemus californicus Horn, 1871 i c g
 Rhyssemus canaliculatus Clement, 1969 c g
 Rhyssemus cantabricus Balthasar, 1961 c g
 Rhyssemus capensis Clouet, 1901 c g
 Rhyssemus carinatipennis Péringuey, 1901 c g
 Rhyssemus carinatus Pittino, 1984 c g
 Rhyssemus chinensis Pittino, 1996 c g
 Rhyssemus convexus Bénard, 1911 c g
 Rhyssemus crispus Schmidt, 1916 c g
 Rhyssemus decellei Pittino, 1984 c g
 Rhyssemus descarpentriesi Pittino, 1990 c g
 Rhyssemus dispar Pittino, 1990 c g
 Rhyssemus endroedyyoungai Petrovitz, 1975 c g
 Rhyssemus evae Endrödi, 1964 c g
 Rhyssemus exaratus Marseul, 1878 c g
 Rhyssemus fairmairei Clouet, 1901 c g
 Rhyssemus falcatus Petrovitz, 1961 c g
 Rhyssemus feae Clouet, 1901 c g
 Rhyssemus ferenczi Endrödi, 1976 c g
 Rhyssemus frankenbergeri Balthasar, 1942 c g
 Rhyssemus franzi Petrovitz, 1963 c g
 Rhyssemus freudei Balthasar, 1960 c g
 Rhyssemus freyi Petrovitz, 1963 c g
 Rhyssemus germanus (Linnaeus, 1767) i c g b
 Rhyssemus gestroi Clouet, 1901 c g
 Rhyssemus ghanaensis Petrovitz, 1975 c g
 Rhyssemus goudoti Harold, 1868 c g
 Rhyssemus granosus (Klug & Erichson, 1842) c g
 Rhyssemus granulosocostatus Clouet, 1901 c g
 Rhyssemus granulosus Ballion, 1871 c g
 Rhyssemus grossepunctatus Balthasar, 1961 c g
 Rhyssemus guineensis Petrovitz, 1969 c g
 Rhyssemus haafi Petrovitz, 1964 c g
 Rhyssemus hamatus Petrovitz, 1963 c g
 Rhyssemus haroldi Clouet, 1901 c g
 Rhyssemus hauseri Balthasar, 1933 c g
 Rhyssemus helenae Pittino, 1983 c g
 Rhyssemus histrio Balthasar, 1961 c g
 Rhyssemus histrioides Petrovitz, 1963 c g
 Rhyssemus horni Clouet, 1901 c g
 Rhyssemus hottentottus Petrovitz, 1963 c g
 Rhyssemus imitator Pittino, 1990 c g
 Rhyssemus indicus Clouet, 1901 c g
 Rhyssemus inermis Clouet, 1901 c g
 Rhyssemus infidus Pittino, 1984 c g
 Rhyssemus inscitus (Walker, 1858) c g
 Rhyssemus insularis Pittino, 1983 c g
 Rhyssemus interruptus Reitter, 1892 c g
 Rhyssemus karnatakaensis Pittino, 1984 c g
 Rhyssemus keisseri Bénard, 1910 c g
 Rhyssemus koreanus Stebnicka, 1980 c g
 Rhyssemus laevinasus Petrovitz, 1964 c g
 Rhyssemus lamyensis Petrovitz, 1963 c g
 Rhyssemus laoticus Pittino, Rakovic & Mencl, 2013 c g
 Rhyssemus limbolarius Petrovitz, 1963 c g
 Rhyssemus linnavuorii Balthasar, 1972 c g
 Rhyssemus loebli Petrovitz, 1975 c g
 Rhyssemus macedonicus Bénard, 1923 c g
 Rhyssemus madagassus Harold, 1879 c g
 Rhyssemus maximus Clouet, 1901 c g
 Rhyssemus mayeti Clouet, 1901 c g
 Rhyssemus meridionalis Reitter, 1890 c g
 Rhyssemus meruensis Pittino, 1983 c g
 Rhyssemus mesopotamicus Petrovitz, 1963 c g
 Rhyssemus mexicanus Hinton, 1934 c g
 Rhyssemus mimus Balthasar, 1961 c g
 Rhyssemus mirus Petrovitz, 1967 c g
 Rhyssemus morgani Bénard, 1911 c g
 Rhyssemus murghabensis (Balthasar, 1967) c g
 Rhyssemus namorokae Pittino, 1990 c g
 Rhyssemus nanshanchicus Masumoto, 1977 c g
 Rhyssemus neglectus Brown, 1929 i c g
 Rhyssemus nitidus Petrovitz, 1972 c g
 Rhyssemus obliviosus Petrovitz, 1963 c g
 Rhyssemus olympiae Pittino, 1990 c g
 Rhyssemus osmanlis Koshantschikov, 1916 c g
 Rhyssemus parallelicollis Clouet, 1901 c g
 Rhyssemus parallelus Reitter, 1892 c g
 Rhyssemus pauliani Pittino, 1990 c g
 Rhyssemus pectoralis Clouet, 1901 c g
 Rhyssemus perissinottoi Pittino, 1983 c g
 Rhyssemus perlatus Petrovitz, 1975 c g
 Rhyssemus pertinax Balthasar, 1961 c g
 Rhyssemus peyrierasi Pittino, 1990 c g
 Rhyssemus pfefferi Balthasar, 1972 c g
 Rhyssemus plicatus (Germar, 1817) c g
 Rhyssemus polycolpus Fairmaire, 1886 c g
 Rhyssemus pondoensis Petrovitz, 1967 c g
 Rhyssemus ponticus Petrovitz, 1962 c g
 Rhyssemus procerus Petrovitz, 1973 c g
 Rhyssemus promontorii Péringuey, 1901 c g
 Rhyssemus propinquus Petrovitz, 1964 c g
 Rhyssemus psammobiiformis Petrovitz, 1963 c g
 Rhyssemus punctatissimus Pittino, 1984 c g
 Rhyssemus puncticollis Brown, 1929 c g
 Rhyssemus punctiventris Balthasar, 1961 c g
 Rhyssemus purkynei Balthasar, 1961 c g
 Rhyssemus rajasthani Rakovic, Mencl & Kral, 2017 c g
 Rhyssemus relegatus Balthasar, 1965 c g
 Rhyssemus ressli Petrovitz, 1965 c g
 Rhyssemus ritsemae Clouet, 1901 c g
 Rhyssemus rohani Bénard, 1920 c g
 Rhyssemus rotschildi Bénard, 1909 c g
 Rhyssemus rubeolus Harold, 1871 c g
 Rhyssemus saldaitisi Rakovic, Kral & Mencl, 2016 c g
 Rhyssemus saoudi Pittino, 1984 c g
 Rhyssemus sardous Pierotti, 1980 c g
 Rhyssemus scaber Haldeman, 1848 i c g b
 Rhyssemus scabrosus Pittino, 1990 c g
 Rhyssemus schaeuffelei Petrovitz, 1964 c g
 Rhyssemus sculptilipennis Schmidt, 1916 c g
 Rhyssemus seineri Petrovitz, 1969 c g
 Rhyssemus senegalensis Petrovitz, 1972 c g
 Rhyssemus sexcostatus Schmidt, 1909 c g
 Rhyssemus similis Petrovitz, 1963 c g
 Rhyssemus sinuaticollis Pittino, 1984 c g
 Rhyssemus sonatus LeConte, 1881 i c g b
 Rhyssemus spangleri Gordon & Cartwright, 1980 c g
 Rhyssemus spiniger Pittino, 1983 c g
 Rhyssemus subdolus Balthasar, 1961 c g
 Rhyssemus sulcatus (Olivier, 1789) c g
 Rhyssemus syriacus Petrovitz, 1971 c g
 Rhyssemus testudo Pittino, 1990 c g
 Rhyssemus thailandicus Pittino, 1996 c g
 Rhyssemus thomasi Endrödi, 1964 c g
 Rhyssemus tristis Petrovitz, 1969 c g
 Rhyssemus trisulcatus Petrovitz, 1956 c g
 Rhyssemus tschadensis Petrovitz, 1963 c g
 Rhyssemus tsihombensis Pittino, 1990 c g
 Rhyssemus tuberculicollis Petrovitz, 1965 c g
 Rhyssemus uncispinis Pittino, 1984 c g
 Rhyssemus vaulogeri Clouet, 1901 c g
 Rhyssemus verrucosus Mulsant, 1842 c g
 Rhyssemus villosus Pittino, 1990 c g
 Rhyssemus vinodolensis Petrovitz, 1963 c g
 Rhyssemus waboniensis Petrovitz, 1964 c g
 Rhyssemus xerxes Pittino, 1983 c g
 Rhyssemus zumpti Petrovitz, 1956 c g

Data sources: i = ITIS, c = Catalogue of Life, g = GBIF, b = Bugguide.net

References

Rhyssemus
Articles created by Qbugbot